Manuel Borrego (born 2 December 1934) is a Portuguese fencer. He competed in the individual foil and team épée events at the 1960 Summer Olympics.

References

External links
 

1934 births
Living people
Portuguese male épée fencers
Olympic fencers of Portugal
Fencers at the 1960 Summer Olympics
Portuguese male foil fencers